Smolarnia may refer to the following places:
Smolarnia, Czarnków-Trzcianka County in Greater Poland Voivodeship (west-central Poland)
Smolarnia, Konin County in Greater Poland Voivodeship (west-central Poland)
Smolarnia, Masovian Voivodeship (east-central Poland)
Smolarnia, Opole Voivodeship (south-west Poland)